The women's heptathlon event at the 2008 African Championships in Athletics was held at the Addis Ababa Stadium on May 2–3.

Medalists

Results

100 metres hurdles
Wind: –1.4 m/s

High jump

Shot put

200 metres
Wind: -3.6 m/s

Long jump

Javelin throw

800 metres

Final standings

References
Results (Archived)

2008 African Championships in Athletics
Combined events at the African Championships in Athletics
2008 in women's athletics